Temple Tifereth-Israel is a Reform Jewish synagogue in Beachwood, Ohio, a Cleveland suburb. It was founded in 1850 as Tifereth Israel (Glory of Israel) and was a founding member of the Union of American Hebrew Congregations (now the Union for Reform Judaism). The main facility is on Shaker Boulevard in Beachwood. The congregation's former home known as The Temple in University Circle, Cleveland, is still used for special events and life cycle celebrations.

Moses J. Gries was rabbi of the congregation from 1892 to his retirement in 1917.

For 46 years (1917-1963) this congregation was led by the renowned Rabbi Abba Hillel Silver and was referred to as "Silver's Temple."

It currently functions as one of several Jewish centers of community with a religious school and services as well. It contains a library and a museum, as well as several chapels and sanctuaries. People hold B'nai Mitzvot at the Temple and classes are held as well. A thriving Jewish community exists in Cleveland's eastern suburbs, so the Temple's membership of more than 1,500 households continues to grow.

The Maltz Museum of Jewish Heritage is located next to The Temple in Beachwood and houses part of the Temple Museum's collection.

References

External links
The Temple Tifereth-Israel home page
Rabbi Abba Hillel Silver
Temple history

Beachwood, Ohio
Founding members of the Union for Reform Judaism
Reform synagogues in Ohio
Buildings and structures in Cuyahoga County, Ohio
Synagogues completed in 1963